, is a Japanese Shinshūkyō (new religious movement) founded in 1924 by Tokuharu Miki (1871–1938), who was a priest in the Ōbaku sect of Zen Buddhism.  The stated aim of the Church of Perfect Liberty is to bring about world peace.

Teachings
PL teaches that "Life is Art" and that humans are born to express their own unique individuality in everything they do, "creating true art". To assist them in improving their lives and overcoming hardships, church members are taught why they have these problems and are guided in solving them by the Patriarch (known as oshieoya-sama 'teacher-parent') and church ministers.

Precepts

PL does not have a holy book, but it has 21 PL Precepts which were announced by Tokuchika Miki on September 29, 1947. They became the basic teachings of the Church.

The 21 PL precepts are:

 Life is art
 To live is to express one's self
 God appears through one's self
 Being annoyed limits your expression
 One's self is lost by being emotional
 Efface your self conceptions
 Everything exists in relativity
 Live as the sun
 Human beings are all equal
 Love yourself and others
 Always be with god
 Everything has a way according to its name
 There is a way for men and a way for women
 World peace is everything
 All is a mirror
 All things progress and develop
 Grasp what is most essential
 Each moment is a turning point
 Begin once you perceive
 Live maintaining equilibrium between mind and matter
 Live in perfect liberty

Membership

The church claims to have more than one million followers worldwide and 500 churches located in ten countries.

Most of the parishes are located in Japan, but due to the active missionary work in the 1960s PL was established in South America and the United States as well. In the 21st century it also has a presence in Canada, Brazil, Argentina, Paraguay, and Peru. The Oceanian headquarters was founded in the 1990s in Brisbane, Australia. Small communities exist in Europe as well, especially in France, Portugal and Hungary.

1970 saw the construction of the  PL Peace Tower, a monument to all the people who have died in war, from the beginning of time.

Organization
PL's spiritual leader, the Patriarch, is called Oshieoya-sama (English: Father of the Teachings). The third and current Patriarch of the church is Takahito Miki. Miki is also the vice president of Shinshuren, the Federation of New Religious Organizations of Japan.

The second Patriarch Tokuchika Miki three times visited the Holy See, and met two Popes to improve inter-religious cooperation.

References

External links

 PL Kyodan International: official website
 PL in Adherents

Buddhist new religious movements
Religious organizations based in Japan
Japanese new religions
Religious organizations established in 1924